Régis Lant (born 10 June 1977), better known as Nornagest, is a vocalist and writer, best known for his vocal works with the black metal band Enthroned and Absu's self-titled release.

His career started in the Belgian metal band Heresia. In 1995, Nornagest was invited to join Enthroned on their first album Prophecies of Pagan Fire but declined the offer. The album became one of the cult albums of the genre, even though some fans consider previous vocalist Sabathan's vocals hard to handle. Shortly after the recording of the album, Nornagest joined the band as the lead guitarist anyway.

In 2007, Nornagest took over vocals duties in Enthroned after previous vocalist Sabathan decided to quit the band.

Nornagest has an English background and is the cousin of Conrad "Cronos" Lant, lead singer of the cult black metal band Venom. This is mentioned by his cousin Anthony Lant drummer of Defcon-One in an interview he did with metalunderground in April 2012. He currently resides in Dendermonde, Belgium.

He describes himself as a follower of the left-hand path and practitioner of scorpionic magick.

Discography 
 Heresia: Fall into Dementia (1992)
 Infected: Progress Legacy (1994)
 The Beast: Pacta Conventa Doemoniorum (1996)
 Enthroned: Towards the Skullthrone of Satan (1997)
 Enthroned: Regie Sathanas (1998)
 The Beast: Him (1998)
 Enthroned: The Apocalypse Manifesto (1999)
 Enthroned: P-2000 (2000)
 Enthroned: Armoured Bestial Hell (2000)
 The Beast: Fixed by the Devil (2002)
 Enthroned: Carnage in Worlds Beyond (2002)
 Enthroned: Goatlust (2003)
 Plague: Vision of the Twilight (2003)
 Enthroned: XES Haereticum (2004)
 Enthroned: Black Goat Ritual (2005)
 Antaeus: Blood Libels (2006) Lyrics
 Enthroned: Tetra Karcist (2007)
 Grabak: Agash Daeva (2007) as guest vocalist
 Demonizer: Tryumphator (2008) as guest vocalist
 Absu: Absu (2009) as guest vocalist
 Enthroned: Pentagrammaton (2010)
 Enthroned: Obsidium (2012)
 Enthroned: Sovereigns (2014)
 Enthroned: Cold Black Suns (2019)

Bibliography 
 The Spiritual Significance of Music (2010), Justin St Vincent Publishings
 Qliphoth; Flesh Totems and Mask Bones (2012), Aeon Sophia Press
 Sethnakht and the XXth Dynasty (2014), self-released

References

1977 births
Living people
Belgian occultists
Belgian rock guitarists
Belgian rock singers
Black metal singers
21st-century Belgian male singers
21st-century Belgian singers
21st-century guitarists
Belgian people of English descent